Fredersdorf-Vogelsdorf is a municipality in the district Märkisch-Oderland, in Brandenburg, Germany.

Geography
The municipality, situated 23 km east of Berlin centre, is composed by the main settlement of Fredersdorf and by Vogelsdorf.

Demography

Transport
The village is well connected to Berlin by the S-Bahn line S5 at the station of Fredersdorf.

Twin towns
Fredersdorf-Vogelsdorf is twinned with:
  Marquette-lez-Lille (France)
  Sleaford, Lincolnshire, England (since 2009)

References

External links

Localities in Märkisch-Oderland